Prachinburi province is one of Thailand's seventy-seven provinces (changwat), it lies in eastern Thailand. Neighboring provinces are (from north clockwise) Nakhon Ratchasima, Sa Kaeo, Chachoengsao, and Nakhon Nayok.

Geography
The province is divided into two major parts, the low river valley of the Bang Pakong River, and the higher lands with plateaus and mountains of the Sankamphaeng Range, the southern prolongation of the Dong Phaya Yen mountains.

National parks
There area two national parks, along with two other national parks, make up region 1 (Prachinburi) of Thailand's protected areas. 
 Thap Lan National Park, 
 Khao Yai National Park,

Symbols
The provincial seal shows the Bodhi tree. It symbolizes the first Bodhi tree planted about 2,000 years ago at Wat Si Maha Phot. The provincial colors are red and yellow. Red symbolises the land and yellow, Buddhism.

The provincial tree is the Bodhi tree (Ficus religiosa). The provincial flower is the cork tree (Millingtonia hortensis).

Administrative divisions

Provincial government
The province is divided into seven districts (amphoes). These are further divided into 65 subdistricts (tambons) and 658 villages (mubans).

The missing numbers 4 and 5 as well as 10 to 12 are districts split off to form Sa Kaeo province.

Local government
As of 26 November 2019 there are: one Prachinburi Provincial Administration Organisation and 13 municipal (thesaban) areas in the province. Prachinburi has town (thesaban mueang) status. Further 12 subdistrict municipalities (thesaban tambon). The non-municipal areas are administered by 56 Subdistrict Administrative Organisations - SAO (ongkan borihan suan tambon).

Transport

Roads
The main road through Prachinburi is Route 319. While Route 319 does not lead directly to other major centers, along with Route 33 it leads to Nakhon Nayok, and along with Routes 314 and 304 it leads to Bangkok.

Rail
Prachinburi is served by the State Railway of Thailand's Eastern Line. Five trains go to Bangkok and five come to Prachinburi each day, with a commute time of around two and a half hours. A one-way ticket costs only 24 bahts.

Economy
Tambon Hua Wa in Si Maha Phot District is the site of Rojana Industrial Park. Among other tenants of the park, Honda Automobile (Thailand) has established a 17.2 billion baht plant there to manufacture sub-compact vehicles. The plant, opened in March 2016, has an initial production capacity of 60,000 vehicles per year. The plant is designed to build up to 120,000 vehicles per year. Honda produces hybrid electric vehicles and batteries for electric vehicles, at its factories in Prachinburi and Ayutthaya. Honda's Prachinburi factory has an annual capacity of 120,000 units.

Health 
The main hospital of Prachinburi province is Chaophraya Abhaibhubejhr Hospital.

Human achievement index 2017

Since 2003, United Nations Development Programme (UNDP) in Thailand has tracked progress on human development at sub-national level using the Human achievement index (HAI), a composite index covering all the eight key areas of human development. National Economic and Social Development Board (NESDB) has taken over this task since 2017.

References

External links

Provincial Website
Prachinburi from the Tourism Authority of Thailand
Khao Yai National Park

 
Provinces of Thailand